Howard Ford (18 December 1905 – 28 March 1986) was an English track and field athlete who competed for Great Britain in the 1928 Summer Olympics.

He was born in Hawarden, Flintshire and died in St. James's.

In 1928 he was eliminated after eight events of the Olympic decathlon competition.

At the 1930 Empire Games he won the silver medal in the pole vault contest. In the shot put event he finished fifth and in the discus throw competition he finished sixth.

External links
sports-reference.com

1905 births
1986 deaths
People from Hawarden
Sportspeople from Flintshire
British male pole vaulters
British male shot putters
British male discus throwers
British decathletes
English male pole vaulters
English decathletes
English male shot putters
English male discus throwers
Olympic athletes of Great Britain
Athletes (track and field) at the 1928 Summer Olympics
Athletes (track and field) at the 1930 British Empire Games
Commonwealth Games silver medallists for England
Commonwealth Games medallists in athletics
Medallists at the 1930 British Empire Games